Mario Markic  (born 1953 in Río Gallegos, Argentina) is an Argentine journalist and writer. He has written "Cuadernos del camino" and "Patagonia de puño y letra", he also hosts "En el camino" and "La mejor publicidad del mundo", TV shows.

In 2011 he won the Martín Fierro in the category of "Mejor labor periodistica masculina" for his work in Telenoche.

References

External links
Facebook of La mejor publicidad del mundo and La patagonia de Mario Markic
Twitter of Mario Markic

1953 births
Living people
People from Río Gallegos, Santa Cruz
Argentine people of Croatian descent
Argentine male writers
Argentine journalists
Male journalists
TN (TV channel)